Microdomatidae is an extinct family of fossil sea snails, marine gastropod mollusks in the superfamily Trochoidea (according to the taxonomy of the Gastropoda by Bouchet & Rocroi, 2005).

Taxonomy 
This family consists of two following subfamilies (according to the taxonomy of the Gastropoda by Bouchet & Rocroi, 2005):
 Microdomatinae Wenz, 1938
 Decorospirinae Blodgett & Frýda, 1999

Genera 
Genera within the family Microdomatidae include:

Subfamily Microdomatinae:
 Limburgia
 Microdoma - type genus

Subfamily Decorospirinae:

subfamily ?
 Amaurotoma
 Copidocatomus
 Cyclites
 Cyclobathmus
 Episfaxis
 Glyptospira
 Kinkaidia

References 

 Paleobiology Database info